Daniel Cady Eaton (September 12, 1834 – June 29, 1895) was an American botanist and author.  After studies at the Rensselaer Institute in Troy and  Russell's military school in New Haven, he gained his bachelor's degree at Yale College, then went on to Harvard University, where he studied with Asa Gray. He then went to Yale University's Sheffield Scientific School in 1864, where he was a botany professor and herbarium curator.  Eaton is the grandson of Amos Eaton.

He also worked in Utah, contributing to the US-Mexican Boundary Survey and various geological surveys.

Notable publications

Beautiful Ferns; from Original Water-Color Drawings after Nature. Paintings by C. E. Faxon and J. H. Emerton. New York: Nims & Knight, Troy. 1887 (c. 1885). 96 pp, 10 plates. 
Enumeration of the Ferns of Cuba and Venezuela. 1860.
The Ferns of North America: Colored Figures and Descriptions, with Synonymy and Geographical Distribution, of the Ferns (Including the Ophioglossaceae) of the United States of America and the British North American Possessions. Volumes 1–2. 81 color plates by James H. Emerton and C. E. Faxon. Salem, Massachusetts: S. E. Cassino. 1877–1880. Folio.
Systematic Fern List [Eastern North America]. 1880.

Partial list of species named by D. C. Eaton:
Asplenium bradleyi
Dryopteris clintoniana (as Aspidium cristatum var. clintonianum)
Pellaea mucronata
Woodsia scopulina

References

External links

 Daniel Cady Eaton papers (MS 581). Manuscripts and Archives, Yale University Library. 

 
 
 Digitised works and other sources of information on Daniel Cady Eaton in the Biodiversity Heritage Library

1834 births
1895 deaths
American botanists
Pteridologists
Harvard University alumni
Yale University faculty
Yale College alumni